Argentina elongata is a species of fish in the family Argentinidae found around southern Australia, and New Zealand, at depths of between . It is a species of minor importance to local commercial fisheries.

References
 
 Tony Ayling & Geoffrey Cox, Collins Guide to the Sea Fishes of New Zealand,  (William Collins Publishers Ltd, Auckland, New Zealand 1982) 

Argentinidae
Marine fish of Southern Australia
Marine fish of New Zealand
Taxa named by Frederick Hutton (scientist)
Fish described in 1879